Ikata Choseichi Dam is a gravity dam located in Ehime Prefecture in Japan. The dam is used for irrigation and water supply. The catchment area of the dam is 0.8 km2. The dam impounds about 1  ha of land when full and can store 104 thousand cubic meters of water. The construction of the dam was started on 1973 and completed in 1989.

References

Dams in Ehime Prefecture
1989 establishments in Japan